The Third Koizumi Cabinet governed Japan for the final year of Junichiro Koizumi's term as Prime Minister, from September 2005 to September 2006, following the landslide victory of his coalition in the "postal election" of 2005.

Background
Following his re-election by the National Diet on September 21, Koizumi did not make any ministerial changes when inaugurating his third cabinet, keeping his previous team in place to focus on the re-introduction and passage of the bills to privatize Japan Post, which had formed the basis for his re-election campaign. Once this was accomplished, Koizumi conducted his final cabinet reshuffle on October 31 at the end of the Diet session. This reshuffle promoted several potential successors including Sadakazu Tanigaki, who was reappointed as Finance Minister, Tarō Asō, who was moved to become Foreign Minister, and Shinzō Abe, who was promoted from LDP Secretary General to the post of Chief Cabinet Secretary. Koizumi also promoted Heizō Takenaka his long-serving minister for economic reform, to the position of Minister for Internal Affairs and Communications to oversee the implementation of postal and administrative reform.

Since 1980, the Liberal Democratic Party has limited its leader to two consecutive terms, meaning that Koizumi was bound to stand down as Prime Minister in September 2006 when his second term expired. This gave him just one year following his re-election to conclude the reforms he had advocated during his terms of office, though he admitted in September 2005 that some would not be achieved in that time, such as constitutional revision to allow the Self-Defence Forces full military status. During the final session of the Diet under Koizumi's premiership, 82 out of 91 government bills were passed, including administrative and healthcare reforms, though education, constitutional and criminal law reforms were not enacted. Despite calls from some members of the LDP and the Komeito to amend party rules and allow him to stay on (amendments which allow the President of LDP have another 3 years term, which later amended by Shinzo Abe in 2015), Koizumi adhered to the term limit and retired in September 26, 2006.

Election of the Prime Minister

Lists of Ministers 

R = Member of the House of Representatives
C = Member of the House of Councillors

Cabinet

Reshuffled Cabinet

References

External links 
Pages at the Kantei (English website):
 Koizumi Administration 
 List of Ministers 
 (Reshuffled)

Cabinet of Japan
2005 establishments in Japan
2006 disestablishments in Japan
Cabinets established in 2005
Cabinets disestablished in 2006